Boissevain is an unincorporated urban community in Manitoba near the North Dakota border that held town status prior to 2015. It is located within the Municipality of Boissevain – Morton. Boissevain is a community of just over 1,500 people and it is located between Killarney and Deloraine on the east and west and Brandon to the north.  The population of the surrounding area, within a 50 kilometre radius of the community, is about 15,000.

It is notable for its proximity to the International Peace Garden, a short drive south on Highway 10.  The community also displays a number of wall murals as a tourist attraction.  The community was named after Adolphe Boissevain who helped finance the Canadian Pacific Railway. Boissevain, not far from Turtle Mountain and Turtle Mountain Provincial Park, also formerly hosted the "International Turtle Derby", a turtle race, each summer.  "Tommy the Turtle" is a 28-foot-tall, 10,000-lb western painted turtle that serves as an icon for both the Turtle Derby and the community as a whole.

History
Work began along the anticipated route of the Canadian Pacific Railway in 1874, surveyors were impressed with the Turtle Mountain region and noted it would become a chief point of settlement in the coming years. The site of the town of Boissevain was decided by the CPR in 1885. By 1886 there was a blacksmith shop, a post office and two grain warehouses. The new settlement was named in honour of a Dutch financier, Adolf Boissevain, who introduced CPR shares for sale in Europe.

As pioneer life transitioned to the comforts of a growing town, many new buildings, schools and churches were built. One of the prominent buildings constructed was the St. Matthew's Anglican Church, built with granite walls found in the local fields. Sandstone was also discovered nearby by the earlier surveyors. The sandstone was used to construct another place of worship and local landmark, the St. Paul's United Church which was completed in 1893.

Like many towns in the west, Boissevain's prosperity came with the railway, in this case the CPR line was the first to arrive in 1885. Three other additional railways in the area, including the Great Northern Railway through the railway's subsidiary organized under the name of the "Brandon, Saskatchewan and Hudson Bay Railway", which meant that farmers could now ship their goods to the United States in the south while also having a link with Brandon to the north. The railways began to decline during The Great Depression and with it the fortunes of Boissevain. The Great Northern line ended service in 1936.

Demographics 

Education 
Boissevain School was nominated one of Canada's 30 best schools by Maclean's Magazine in 2005.

Media 
CJRB (1220 AM) broadcasts an easy listening format from Boissevain. The station is owned by Golden West Broadcasting.

Sports
Curling has been a competitive sport in Boissevain since 1890. The Boissevain Border Kings compete in the South West Hockey League in Manitoba. The Border Kings did not win a championship for 35 years but then wound up winning six straight championships in 1993. In baseball, the Boissevain Bantams won the provincial championship in 1977. Currently, the Boissevain Broncos high school sports program includes several teams competing in football, baseball, and hockey.

Notable people
John A. Campbell (Manitoba politician), politician
Bill Crump, Anglican bishop
Edward Dow, politician
Betty Fox, mother of Terry Fox
David R. Henderson, economist
John Hettle, politician
James Johnson (Manitoba politician), politician
Reuben Martin, politician
George William McDonald, politician
Norah Michener, philosopher
Bev Munro, Radio Host, musician, CFCW Edmonton/Camrose
Randy Neufeld, curler
Rick Neufeld, musician
Frederick Laurence Schaffner, politician

See also
 International Peace Garden Border Crossing

References

External links 

 Boissevain community website
 Stats Canada - Census Profile
 Map of Boissevain at Statcan

Former towns in Manitoba
Populated places disestablished in 2015
2015 disestablishments in Manitoba